The 2021–22 Thai League 3 Northern region is a region in the regional stage of the 2021–22 Thai League 3. The tournament was sponsored by Blue Dragon Lottery Online, and known as the Blue Dragon League for sponsorship purposes. A total of 12 teams located in Northern, Upper western, and Upper central of Thailand will compete in the league of the Northern region.

Teams

Number of teams by province

Stadiums and locations

Foreign players

A T3 team could register 3 foreign players from foreign players all around the world. A team can use 3 foreign players on the field in each game.
Note :: players who released during second leg transfer window;: players who registered during second leg transfer window.
{|class="unsortable"
|-
| style="width:15px; background:#ffdddd;"| ||Other foreign players.
|-
| style="width:15px; background:#ffffdd;"| ||AFC member countries players.
|-
| style="width:15px; background:#ddffdd;"| ||ASEAN member countries players.
|-
| style="width:15px; background:#c8ccd1;"| ||No foreign player registered.
|}

League table

Standings

Positions by round

Results by round

Results

Season statistics

Top scorers
As of 26 February 2022.

Hat-tricks 

Notes: (H) = Home team; (A) = Away team

Clean sheets 
As of 26 February 2022.

Attendances

Overall statistical table

Attendances by home match played

Source: Thai League

See also
 2021–22 Thai League 1
 2021–22 Thai League 2
 2021–22 Thai League 3
 2021–22 Thai League 3 Northeastern Region
 2021–22 Thai League 3 Eastern Region
 2021–22 Thai League 3 Western Region
 2021–22 Thai League 3 Southern Region
 2021–22 Thai League 3 Bangkok Metropolitan Region
 2021–22 Thai League 3 National Championship
 2021–22 Thai FA Cup
 2021–22 Thai League Cup
 2021 Thailand Champions Cup

References

External links
 Official website of Thai League

Thai League 3
3